McKayle is a surname. People with this surname include:

Donald McKayle (1930–2018), American modern dancer
Camille McKayle (born 1964), Jamaican-born American mathematician

See also
Kayle, also a surname
John McKail (1810–1871), early settler of Western Australia
Pop McKale (1887–1967), American football and baseball player